Tong Dawei (born 3 February 1979) is a Chinese actor and singer. Tong is best known for starring in the television series Jade Goddess of Mercy (2003), Struggle (2007), and Tiger Mom (2015); as well as the films Lost in Beijing (2007), The Flowers of War (2011) and American Dreams in China (2013).

Tong ranked 97th on Forbes China Celebrity 100 list in 2013, 84th in 2014, 51st in 2015.

Early life and career
Tong Dawei was born in 1979 in Fushun, Liaoning. He joined the Shanghai Theater Academy in 1997 and graduated in 2001 with a Bachelor of Arts in Acting.

Tong first gained attention for his role in the romantic film I Love You (2002) by acclaimed director Zhang Yuan. He then starred in Jade Goddess of Mercy (2003), which was a huge hit with the audience in China and launched Tong into a household name. After the success of Jade Goddess of Mercy, none of Tong's performance struck a chord in the audience, till he starred in the youth drama Romantic Life (2006). His powerful performance in the series left a deep impression on the audiences, and Tong returned to the limelight once again.

Tong hit a new peak in his career with his most successful television series yet; Struggle (2007). Based on the popular novel by Shi Kang, Struggle gained unexpected acclaim and was seen as a breakthrough in Chinese TV production as it broke from the usual Chinese TV series focusing in traditional legends and series. Tong's character, Lu Tao, reflected the rise in a new social class in modern China. The same year, he starred in Lost in Beijing which premiered at the Berlin Film Festival and earned Tong a Best New Actor nomination at the Busan Film Critics Awards. He released his debut vocal album titled Da Shi Jie Xiao Zuo Wei (A Small Action in a Big World) in 2007.

In 2008, Tong starred in war epic Red Cliff: Part II, directed by John Woo. The film was also shown at the 2008 Cannes Film Festival, bringing Tong onto the international platform for the first time. The same year, Tong joined the Chinese ensemble in the film The Founding of a Republic, a movie marking the 60th Anniversary of the People's Republic of China.

In 2011, Tong starred in award-winning director Zhang Yimou's film The Flowers of War. Dealing with the sensitive issue of the Rape of Nanjing, Tong plays Major Lee, who died as a hero to save his lost friend during China's anti-Japanese war. To better portray the role, Tong underwent military-like training and lost 16 pounds. Zhang praised Tong's performance, saying that he added an "intellectual temperament to his character" and said he continues to "break through
and impress the audience." He became the first Chinese actor to walk the red carpet of the Golden Globe Awards.

Tong received acclaim for his role as an artistic youth in Peter Chan's American Dreams in China (2013), and he won the Best Supporting Actor awards at the Changchun Film Festival and Hundred Flowers Award. This was followed by another role in Peter Chan film, the critically acclaimed Dearest (2014), based on a true story about child abduction. He also co-starred in John Woo's romantic epic The Crossing (2014), based on the true story of the Taiping steamer collision and follows six characters and their intertwining love stories in Taiwan and Shanghai during the 1930s.

Tong reunited with Dearest co-star Zhao Wei in the television series Tiger Mom (2015), which focuses on parenting and children education. Tong won Best Actor at the 17th Huading Awards for his performance.

In 2016, Tong was appointed goodwill ambassador of National Committees for UN Women.

Personal life
On 17 April 2008, Tong married Guan Yue (born 1979), a film and television actress and the niece of Rosamund Kwan. The wedding was held in the Hotel sofitel Wanda, Beijing. They have two daughters and one son.

Filmography

Film

Television series

Awards and nominations

References

External links

Tong Dawei on chinesemov.com

Male actors from Liaoning
People from Fushun
1979 births
Living people
Singers from Liaoning
20th-century Chinese male actors
21st-century Chinese male actors
Shanghai Theatre Academy alumni
Chinese male stage actors
Chinese male film actors
Chinese male television actors
Manchu male actors
Manchu singers
21st-century Chinese male singers